Pet Pals is an Italian animated television series. It was created by Sergio Manfio while the Disney cartoonist Giorgio Cavazzano served as art director. Two feature films based on the series were produced: Cuccioli - Il codice di Marco Polo in 2010 and Cuccioli - Il paese del vento in 2014.

Plot
The antagonist, Crow Witch, hates the city of Venice, and she wants to drain the Venetian lagoon, but the Pet Pals, an animal team that consists of the six primary protagonists (Holly, a female cat; Moby, a dog; Top Hat, a rabbit; Diva, a female duck; Pio, a frog, and Nameless, a Canary), completely disagree with this idea. Their religions are Catholicism. As The Pet Pals want to fight back the witch's wicked plans, they cannot wait to get started in their most challenging mission to date, which involves finding Marco Polo's Code and saving Venice, even if this means putting their busy lives on hold for a while.

Characters
Olly - The shrewd and wise kitten of the group, she has brisk and hasty ways, with a direct and colorful language. Original voice actress: Monica Ward
Top Hat- The goofy and troublemaking rabbit athlete . He is in love with Diva, but she only returns him with punches in the head. Original voice actor : Edoardo Nevola
Pio - The eccentric and funny frog . He is a skilled imitator, a faculty that will often help the protagonists get out of trouble. Speak with a loud, low r. His face resembles Rayman's . Original voice actor: Luigi Rosa
Portable - The cultured, calm and sweet dog of letters, uses polished language and is a real mine of information. It is called that because as a child he swallowed a mobile phone, which sometimes rings in his stomach. Original voice actor: Paolo Lombardi
Diva - The vain and impulsive fashion expert duck . With her comical pretense of being a prima donna, she often gets the group into trouble. He vents the failures of his claims by punching Cilindro in the head. Original voice actress: Laura Lenghi
Senzanome - The smallest of the group. It is a chick that has never learned to speak and expresses itself using signs depicting objects of all kinds. Many times the figures take shape and the Cubs use the objects created to get out of the way.
Piccolo Mago - Manuel Meli original voice actor
Crow Sorceress - The wicked sorceress who wants to capture puppies. Original voice actors: Paola Giannetti and Graziella Polesinanti
Cuncun and Canbaluc - They are two ermines henchmen of Maga Cornacchia, faithful, but a bit stupid. Original voice actors : Franco Mannella and Enrico Di Troia
Ambrogio - Original voice actor Gerolamo Alchieri
Methuselah - The wise and intelligent tree that appears only in the Spin-off The Mini Cuccioli. Original voice actor : Piero Di Blasio.

Episodes

See also
List of Italian television series

References

Website 

2003 Italian television series debuts
Italian children's animated television series